William John Pritchard (29 January 1927 – 2 November 2011) was an Australian rules footballer who played with Geelong in the Victorian Football League (VFL).

The son of Carlton footballer Francis James Pritchard (1899–1983) and Elizabeth Marion Frances Pritchard, nee Forsyth (1902–1969), William John Pritchard was born at Tatura on 29 January 1927.

Notes

External links 

1927 births
2011 deaths
Australian rules footballers from Victoria (Australia)
Geelong Football Club players